Piranhea trifoliata, the three-leaf piranhea, is a species of tree in the family Picrodendraceae. It is native to Bolivia, Brazil, Guyana and Venezuela. The flowers are attractive to bees.

References

Picrodendraceae